Walter Jennings (20 October 1897 – 15 November 1970) was an English professional footballer who played as a goalkeeper.

References

1897 births
1970 deaths
Footballers from Grimsby
English footballers
Association football goalkeepers
Welholme Old Boys F.C. players
Grimsby Town F.C. players
Swansea City A.F.C. players
Southend United F.C. players
Boston Town F.C. players
Blackpool F.C. players
English Football League players